The  1997 Australian Sports Sedan Championship was a CAMS sanctioned motor racing title for drivers of Group 2D Sports Sedans. The championship, which was the thirteenth Australian Sports Sedan Championship, was won by Kerry Baily driving a Toyota Celica Supra.

Calendar
The championship was contested over a three-round series with two races per round.

Points system
Championship points were awarded on a 21-19-17-16-15-14-13-12-11-10 basis to the top ten finishers in each race.

Results

References

External links
 Bob Jolly leads Wayne Park at the Winton round of the 1997 Australian Sports Sedan Championship Retrieved from www.minerva.com.au on 10 June 2009

National Sports Sedan Series
Sports Sedan Championship